Frank Hart may refer to: 

 Frank Hart (politician) (1860–1945), Australian politician
 Frank Hart (athlete) (1857/58–1908), American athlete known for pedestrianism

See also
Frank Harte (1933–2005), traditional Irish singer, song collector, architect, and lecturer
Frank Heart (1929–2018), American computer engineer